Stinnett may refer to:

Places
In the United States:
 Stinnett, Kentucky
 Stinnett, Texas
 Stinnett, Wisconsin

People with the surname

 Bobbie Jo Stinnett (1981-2004), American murder victim
 Christina Stinnett, Micronesian activist and businesswoman
 Grant Stinnett, American bassist
 Kelly Stinnett, baseball player
 Robert Stinnett, sailor and writer
 Sandra Stinnett, American statistician
 William Stinnett, Guam basketball player

See also
Stennett (disambiguation)